Dixon is a populated place in Seminole County, Oklahoma, at an elevation of 863 feet.  It is less than two miles west of Wewoka, Oklahoma, the county seat.  It is located on Business 270, being an offshoot of US Route 270 which bypasses Dixon to the west and south.

References

Populated places in Oklahoma
Populated places in Seminole County, Oklahoma